Martin Suckling (born 23 November 1981) is a British composer. He is also a violinist and teacher.

Education
Suckling was born in Glasgow and attended Bearsden Academy. He read music at Clare College, Cambridge and went on to study composition with George Benjamin at King's College London. He was a Paul Mellon Fellow at Yale University, where he studied with Ezra Laderman and Martin Bresnick in the Yale School of Music. On returning to the UK he undertook doctoral research at the Royal Academy of Music, supervised by Simon Bainbridge.

Career
While still a student, Suckling received commissions from the Deutsches Symphonie-Orchester Berlin (Play, 2005) and the London Symphony Orchestra (The Moon, the Moon!, 2007). He won the Royal Philharmonic Society Composition Prize in 2008, leading to a commission from the Wigmore Hall for the Aronowitz Ensemble (To See the Dark Between, 2010). In 2011, the London Sinfonietta commission and premiere of Candlebird, a song cycle to texts by Don Paterson, led to critical acclaim. Subsequent commissions have come from ensembles such as the London Contemporary Orchestra, BBC Scottish Symphony Orchestra, Scottish Ensemble and the Scottish Chamber Orchestra, with whom Suckling was appointed Associate Composer in 2014.

Previously Stipendiary Lecturer in Music at Somerville College, Oxford, since 2012 Suckling has been a lecturer in the Music Department at the University of York, where he teaches courses in Composition, Orchestration, and Spectral Music.

Suckling's music often explores aspects of microtonality, and he has acknowledged his debt in this regard to composers associated with spectral music. Other influences include Scottish folk music – Suckling was a fiddle player in several ceilidh bands in his teens – and literature, especially poetry.

Key works
 The Moon, the Moon! (2007; symphony orchestra)
 To See the Dark Between (2010; string sextet and piano)
 Lieder ohne Worte (2010; piano solo)
 Candlebird (2011; baritone and large ensemble)
 de sol y grana (2011; violin and ensemble)
 storm, rose, tiger (2011; chamber orchestra)
 Postcards (2012–13; string ensemble)
 Release (2013; symphony orchestra)
 Nocturne (2013; violin and cello)
 Six Speechless Songs (2013; chamber orchestra)
 Songs from a Bright September (2014; baritone and piano trio)
 Visiones (after Goya) (2015; clarinet, cello, piano)
 Psalm (after Celan) (2015; harp and three groups of four instruments)
 Piano Concerto (2014–16; piano and chamber orchestra)
 The White Road (after Edmund de Waal) (2016; flute and symphony orchestra)
 Emily's Electrical Absence (2017; string quintet)
 Meditation (after Donne) (2018; chamber orchestra and live electronics)
 This Departing Landscape (2019; symphony orchestra)
 The Tuning (2019; mezzo soprano and piano, texts by Michael Donaghy)
 Her Lullaby (2019; solo viola (or violin or cello))

Discography
 Candlebird – London Sinfonietta, Leigh Melrose, Nicholas Collon, SINF CD1-2012
 Fanfare for a Newborn Child – London Symphony Orchestra, François Xavier Roth, LSO Live LSO5061
 Piano Concerto; The White Road for flute & orchestra - BBC Scottish Symphony Orchestra, Katherine Bryan (flute), Tamara Stefanovich (piano), Ilan Volkov (conductor). NMC Recordings, due to be released February 2021. (BBC broadcast, September 2020)
 The Moon, the Moon! – London Symphony Orchestra, François Xavier Roth, LSO Live LSO5032 
 To See the Dark Between – Aronowitz Ensemble, Sonimage SON 11202
 Visiones (after Goya) - 'From Score to Sound', Dark Inventions CD 1702

References

External links 
 Martin Suckling's homepage
 Martin Suckling's page at Faber Music Ltd.
 Faber Music Online Score Perusal Library

1981 births
Living people
Scottish composers
Alumni of Clare College, Cambridge
Alumni of King's College London
Alumni of the Royal Academy of Music
British composers
Fellows of Somerville College, Oxford